Room to Breathe is the twenty-fifth studio album by American country music singer Reba McEntire. It was released on November 18, 2003, by MCA Nashville Records. It was produced by Buddy Cannon, McEntire, and Norro Wilson.

Room to Breathe was McEntire's first album of new recordings since 1999's So Good Together and her first studio album of the new millennium. McEntire had previously branched into theater and television, starring in a television sitcom, Reba, and had decided to temporarily leave the recording industry at the start of the new millennium. The release contained McEntire's first number one single in six years with "Somebody," while also hosting three additional singles between 2003 and 2005.

Background
Room to Breathe was recorded in Nashville Tennessee in 2003 and consists of twelve tracks. About.com album reviewer, Matt Bjorke referred to the album as "a competent collection of well written, fun and emotional tunes. In essence, it's a return to form for Reba and should prove to be a critical and commercial success." Marshall Bowden of PopMatters considered McEntire's release to contain "more traditional-sounding material", exemplifying tracks such as "I'm Gonna Take My Mountain" and "Love Revival" to evoke this sound. The album was goaled to mainly showcase the different musical styles McEntire had utilized. For this, Bowden praised McEntire and producers, stating that, "McEntire, together with producers Buddy Cannon and Norro Wilson, has done a good job of presenting a variety of sounds. For some, the result will be too diverse and lack focus, but if McEntire can do all of these styles convincingly, why shouldn’t she?"

Some of the material on Room to Breathe included "story songs," such as "He Gets That From Me," which was recorded in memory of individuals who lost family members in the 2001 September 11 Attacks. Another track, "Moving Oleta" explains how an elderly man is forced to move his wife to a nursing home. Certain tracks included background vocals from country artist, Linda Davis. McEntire also collaborated with another country artist, Vince Gill for the closing track, "It Just Has to Be This Way," whom Allmusic reviewer, Maria Konicki Dinoia compared to McEntire's and Gill's number one duet single, "The Heart Won't Lie."

Critical reception

Matt Bjorke of About.com gave Room to Breathe five out five stars, saying, "When you add up the performances throughout the duration of Room To Breathe, Reba has created her best and most personal album yet. With truly something for every country fan, the album is sure to become a big hit with old and new fans alike." Allmusic's Maria Konicki Dinoia gave the album three out of five stars. Even though she gave the album a lower rating, she gave much praise to effort, calling the album to sound, "revitalizing" and show a "cool Reba." Dinoia gave praise to the traditional sound of the album, saying, "On her first studio album in four years, she resurrects her passion for country music that seemed to have been missing on her previous album." Marshall Bowden of PopMatters also found Room to Breathe to also have a more traditional approach to it, comparing it to the sound of country music in the 1970s.

Commercial performance
The lead single from the album, "I'm Gonna Take That Mountain", was released in summer 2003 and peaked in the Hot Country Songs Top 20 at #14. Room to Breathe was officially released November 18, 2003, reaching #4 on the Billboard Top Country Albums chart and peaking at #25 on the Billboard 200 all-genres list with first week sales of 72,297, spending four weeks on the chart, making its last appearance there in January 2004. The album's second single was released in 2004; "Somebody" reached #1 on the Hot Country Songs chart and #35 on the Billboard Hot 100. It was followed by "He Gets That from Me" later in the year, which reached a peak of #7 and the fourth single, "My Sister," reached #16. In August 2005, Room to Breathe was certified platinum by the Recording Industry Association of America.

Track listing

Personnel

Musicians 

 Reba McEntire – lead vocals
 John Hobbs – acoustic piano, synthesizers
 Randy McCormick – acoustic piano, Hammond organ, synthesizers
 Steve Nathan – acoustic piano
 Gary Prim – keyboards
 J. T. Corenflos – electric guitar
 Gregg Galbraith – electric guitar, nylon string guitar
 Dann Huff – electric guitar
 John Jorgenson – electric guitar, mandolin
 Dan Dugmore – acoustic guitar, dobro, steel guitar, lap steel guitar
 B. James Lowry – acoustic guitar, nylon string guitar
 Dan Tyminski – acoustic guitar, mandolin, backing vocals
 David Talbot – banjo
 Rob Ickes – dobro
 Larry Paxton – bass guitar, string arrangements
 Paul Leim – drums, percussion
 Larry Franklin – fiddle
 Alison Krauss – fiddle, backing vocals
 Kristin Wilkinson – string arrangements
 The Nashville String Machine – strings
 Bob Bailey – backing vocals
 Lisa Cochran – backing vocals
 Chip Davis – backing vocals
 Linda Davis – backing vocals
 Kim Fleming – backing vocals
 Vince Gill – lead and backing vocals (12)
 Vicki Hampton – backing vocals
 Sonya Isaacs – backing vocals
 Marabeth Jordan – backing vocals
 Louis Dean Nunley – backing vocals
 Bergen White – backing vocals
 Dennis Wilson – backing vocals
 Curtis Wright – backing vocals

Production and Technical 

 Buddy Cannon – producer 
 Reba McEntire – producer
 Norro Wilson – producer
 Tony Castle – engineer
 Patrick Murphy – assistant engineer
 J.R. Rodriguez – assistant engineer
 John Guess – mixing
 Hank Williams – mastering
 Eberhard Ramm – music copyist
 Shannon Finnegan – project coordination
 Bethany Newman – art direction, design
 Ron Davis – photography
 Michelle Moder – wardrobe
 Brett Freedman – hair stylist
 Terri Apanasewicz – makeup

Charts

Weekly charts

Year-end charts

Singles

Certifications and sales

References

2003 albums
Reba McEntire albums
MCA Records albums
Albums produced by Buddy Cannon
Albums produced by Norro Wilson